Dominique Fernandez is a French former football coach.

Manager career

Laos
Assuming the role of head coach for the Laos national football team in April 2003, Fernandez was contacted by an official from the Lao Football Federation who informed the bespectacled French coach that they had been tracking him since 1998 and offered him the job. Easily adapting into his new job, with the players being voracious learners, Fernandez was head coach of the Laos U23 as well, directing them at the 2003 Southeast Asian Games.

References

External links
 Dominique Fernandez: ""Hải Phòng phải thắng!""

Year of birth missing (living people)
Living people
French football managers
Expatriate football managers in Laos
French expatriate sportspeople in Vietnam
French expatriate football managers
Laos national football team managers
French expatriate sportspeople in Laos
Expatriate football managers in Vietnam